Lloyd Peniston Jones (September 12, 1884 – May 1, 1971) was an American athlete.  He competed in the 1908 Summer Olympics in London. In the 800 metres, Jones finished third in his semifinal heat and did not advance to the final. He was born in Germantown, Pennsylvania and died in Bermuda.

References

Sources
 
 
 
 Lloyd Jones' profile at Sports Reference.com

1884 births
1971 deaths
Athletes (track and field) at the 1908 Summer Olympics
Olympic track and field athletes of the United States
American male middle-distance runners
20th-century American people